Ramalina fraxinea, the cartilage lichen, is a fruticose lichen with erect or pendulous thalli and branches that are flattened. Colour varies from pale green though yellow-grey to white-grey; apothecia are frequent and soralia may also be present.

Habitat and distribution 

This lichen is widespread in the United Kingdom, being found on tree bark. In north-eastern England and eastern Scotland it is often well developed, growing up to 12 cm with thongs of up to 2 cm wide. In less favourable areas it is much smaller. The species has declined markedly since the mid 20th century and is now rare or absent in many UK areas. Its sensitivity to air pollution and fertilizer enrichment may be reasons for the decline.   It is mainly found on the bark of Acer, Fraxinus, Populus, Tilia and Ulmus; it has been found growing on Rhododendron and oak.

It has been recorded in Netherlands, Spain, Belgium, Luxembourg, France, England, Scotland, Hungary, Norway and Latvia. The species has been widely recorded in the United States of America.

Ramalina fraxinea likes windy, exposed and well-lit sites and it is found on species with nutrient-rich bark. The species also likes humid or foggy areas near ponds or rivers.

Structure and appearance 

The Latin name 'Ramas' means branch. This genus is a shrubby or fruticose group with erect or pendulous thalli. The branches are flattened and rather stiff. Colour varies from pale green though yellow-grey to white-grey. Apothecia are frequent and soralia may be present. Apothecia are usually concave and often pruinose.
R. fraxinea branches have a very distinctive shape, being widest toward the middle (as much as 4.5 cm in some specimens) and tapering at both the point of attachment and toward the tip (to about 1 cm). The thallus is  green-grey in colour, pendent and may be as long as 10 cm. It has the overall appearance of being coarsely tufted, individual branches showing a channelled, wrinkled appearance. The branches may have a twist or turn to them. The apothecia are cup-like and convex and are found both along the edges of the branches and on the surface or lamina.

The Ramalinas are also known as 'bush', 'strap', or 'gristle' lichens. They always grow upside-down, and this plant looks like seaweed nailed to a tree.

Life cycle 
The spores are kidney-shaped. It does not contain as many apothecia as Ramalina fastigiata.
The specimens in the photographs here shown here are very large, but does not have many apothecia, the spore-producing discs. The few that were present were borne on short stalks, and were located on the surface of the lobes, especially near the edges.

Sensitivity to air pollution 

Ramalina fraxinae is very sensitive to air pollution (SO2). It likes windy, exposed and well-lit sites and is found mainly on trees. It was found in Edinburgh in 2008 after an absence since 1797 due to air pollution.

Uses 
Ramalina species were at one time dried and ground down to produce a white hair powder and also used as a cure for chilblains. It was also used in making perfumes and in Sweden, northern Europe and northern Russia, R. fraxinea has been used to make brandy.  This process was most commonly used with Cladina rangiferina, but several other lichen species have been used.

References 

fraxinea
Lichen species
Taxa named by Carl Linnaeus
Lichens described in 1753
Lichens of Europe
Lichens of North America